Fox Movies (formerly Star Movies; and Fox Movies Premium) was a Southeast Asian movie network owned by Fox Networks Group Asia Pacific, subsidiaries of International Operations unit of The Walt Disney Company. It has first-run contracts for movies distributed by 20th Century Studios, Disney, Columbia Pictures, Pixar, Marvel Studios, Metro-Goldwyn-Mayer, and DreamWorks and sub-run contracts for movies from Paramount Pictures, Universal Pictures, and Warner Bros.

It also features movies from other movie distributors including: Lions Gate Entertainment, Summit Entertainment, Victor Hugo Pictures, and The Weinstein Company. It is another Hollywood movie channel whose main competitor is HBO Asia. Some of its design is based on the movie Tron: Legacy (the first movie aired on FOX Movies Premium) since the countdown to rebranding and has different station IDs based on type and genre of the movie.

With the launch of Disney+ Hotstar in Indonesia, several first-run films from Disney-owned properties were removed in favour of re-runs, including Marvel films that were produced by other studios. These changes were only available specifically to the Indonesian feed starting from September 1, 2020.

In conjunction of launching Disney+ in Singapore and Malaysia, starting 1 February 2021, several first-run films from Disney-owned properties were removed in favor of re-runs, including Marvel films that were produced by other studios. This applies to all remaining feeds in Asia.

History
On 1 January 2012, Star Movies was rebranded to Fox Movies Premium and FOX Movies Premium HD, available in Hong Kong and selected Southeast Asian countries. In India, China, Middle East and North Africa, Taiwan and the Philippines (SD only), the Star Movies brand remained.

On 10 June 2017, Fox Movies Premium in Southeast Asia & Star Movies in the Philippines, relaunched as Fox Movies, all coinciding the premiere of the 2016 film X-Men Apocalypse.

On November 1, 2017, Star Movies Vietnam was rebranded as Fox Movies Vietnam.

On January 18, 2018, Star Movies Taiwan was rebranded as Fox Movies Taiwan, yet Star Movies HD Taiwan remains the original name.

After 27 years of broadcasting, on April 27, 2021, Disney announced that Fox Movies in Southeast Asia and Hong Kong  would be closing down on October 1, 2021, at exactly 1:00 am (UTC+08:00)/12:00am (UTC+07:00), after which the channel space created by BBC World Service Television in 1991, folded and ceased to exist. The very final and last movie is Happy Death Day (Philippines only) and Pacific Rim: Uprising (rest of Southeast Asia and Hong Kong).

On January 1, 2022, Fox Movies Taiwan was renamed to Star Movies Gold.

On August 15, 2022, FOX Movies Facebook Page unexpectedly reopened after closing on October 1, 2021 when 3 channels of FOX Movies Network stopped broadcasting along with 15 channels of Disney Network Group Asia Pacific.

Final feeds

Fox Movies Asia
Fox Movies Asia (formerly known as Fox Movies Premium) was transmitted in Southeast Asia. It was the only advertisement free version of Fox Movies and, unlike other versions of Fox Movies, this version also spent minimal time promoting its own upcoming movies. The channel did not air promotions of movies classified as unsuitable for people aged under eighteen until 8pm SEAT and 9pm for Malaysia. This channel broadcast 24 hours a day. 5.1 Dolby Surround sound was available and applicable on the HD channel. The channel officially cease operations on October 1, 2021.

Fox Movies Philippines
On June 10, 2017, in line with its Southeast Asian counterpart (Fox Movies Premium), Star Movies in the Philippines was rebranded as Fox Movies. Like its predecessor, it also has English subtitles daily, as well as local advertisements when the movie is taking a break (its HD counterpart, however, does not because of the HD channel formerly using its Asian feed (Fox Movies Premium) and Fox Movies Asia feed). The channel typically broadcasts action, comedy, animation and horror/suspense films every day and drama films on early morning.

On June 12, 2017, the HD channel was converted into Philippine feed during independence day of the Philippines while the Asia feed will continue to broadcast via live streaming on a subscription-based FOX+ which is available to Cignal, Globe, Smart and PLDT Home subscribers and with Chinese subtitles on their movies (along with Fox Family Movies and Fox Action Movies) which was later removed and replaced by Fox Sports including (2 & 3).

On January 1, 2020, FOX Movies Philippines, along with its Philippine-based operating channels: Fox Life, FOX, and National Geographic SD, were reverted to their main Southeast Asian feed. The channel started showing main feed plugs and retained the English subtitles on the movie after the revert, but this feed still initiates a local opt-out after a movie and a lesser ad break in the middle of the movie to accommodate local advertisements. The channel premieres major blockbuster films every Saturday while independent and low-budget films on Mondays and Thursdays.
The channel officially ceased operations on October 1, 2021.

Fox Movies HD
On January 1, 2012, Star Movies HD was rebranded as Fox Movies Premium HD in selected Asian territories where Star Movies has been renamed to Fox Movies Premium. On June 10, 2017, Fox Movies Premium HD has been renamed to Fox Movies HD.
The HD Channel also closed on October 1, 2021.

See also
 Star Movies
 Fox Family Movies
 Fox Action Movies

References

External links
  (archived)

Movie channels
Mass media in Southeast Asia
Cable television in Hong Kong
Television channels and stations established in 2012
Television channels and stations disestablished in 2021
English-language television stations
Defunct television channels
Movie channels in Singapore
Movie channels in Indonesia
Movie channels in Thailand
Movie channels in Hong Kong
Movie channels in Malaysia
Movie channels in the Philippines
Southeast Asia
Fox Networks Group